Ece Yağmur Yavuz (born 2004) is a Turkish artistic gymnast. She competed at the 2020 European Women's Artistic Gymnastics Championships in Mersin, Turkey.

She is a member of Şavkar CSK in Gaziemir, İzmir.

References

External links
 

2004 births
Living people
People from Buca
Sportspeople from İzmir
Turkish female artistic gymnasts
21st-century Turkish women